Positive religion may refer to:
 a concept in the essay "Life of Jesus (Hegel)"
 Religion of Humanity
 Positive Religion (book) by Robert Alfred Vaughan